Luigi Giovanni Giussani (15 October 1922 – 22 February 2005) was an Italian Catholic priest, theologian, educator, public intellectual, and founder of the international Catholic movement Communion and Liberation. His cause for canonization was opened in 2012.

Biography

Luigi Giussani was born on 15 October 1922 in Desio, near Milan, Italy. His father, Beniamino Giussani, was an artist and anarchist. His mother, Angelina Gelosa, worked in a textile factory and was a devout Catholic. 

On 2 October 1933, he entered the diocesan seminary of Saint Peter Martyr Seveso, where he attended the first four years of school. There he discovered a way to understand "secular" works of art (such as the poetry of Giacomo Leopardi, and the music of Ludwig van Beethoven) as expressive of the religious sense and as unconscious prophecies of Christ's incarnation. With his fellow seminarians, including Enrico Manfredini (later Bishop of Piacenza) and Giacomo Biffi (who later became cardinal Archbishop of Bologna) Giussani founded a study group and newsletter under the name Studium Christi.

Giussani was ordained to the priesthood on 26 May 1945 at the young age of 22. His ordination had been accelerated by the authorities in the Milan archdiocese because they feared that the serious respiratory health problems he was experiencing at that time (and which would plague him his entire life) would lead to his death before becoming a priest. Following ordination, Giussani began teaching at the Venegono Seminary. His academic interests were Eastern Christian Theology and American Protestantism.

In the early 1950s he requested of his superiors to be allowed to leave seminary teaching to work in high schools. He was driven by a desire to bring the Christian experience to the school environment in response to the questions of young people living in a context that he perceived to be increasingly hostile to faith and the Catholic Church. He perceived a need to help them discover that a real faith was relevant to one's life.

Beginning in 1954, he taught at the Berchet Lyceum (classical high school) in Milan until 1967. During this time his primary intellectual interest was the problem of education; his involvement with the religious instruction of the students at Berchet was instrumental in the rapid growth of Gioventú Studentesca (GS, Student Youth), at the time a student wing of Azione Cattolica (Catholic Action). In the booklets Conquiste fondamentali per la vita e la presenza cristiana nel mondo (Fundamental Conquests for Christian Life and Presence in the World) (1954, co-authored with Fr. Costantino Oggioni) and L'esperienza (Experience) (1963), Giussani outlined the fundamental ideas behind his approach to the formation of young people. His premise was that Faith is more than doctrines and moral laws, but an event; that Christ is the centre of everything; and that one comes to know Christ in the community of the Church.

In 1964 Giussani began teaching introductory theology at the Università Cattolica del Sacro Cuore in Milan, a position he occupied until 1990. In obedience to a request of his Archbishop, Giovanni Colombo, Giussani left Gioventú Studentesca in 1965 and devoted himself to theological studies. In the late 1960s Fr. Giussani was sent by his religious superiors on several periods of study in the U.S. and wrote Grandi linee della teologia protestante americana. Profilo storico dalle origini agli anni 50 (An Outline of American Protestant Theology. An Historic Profile from the Origins to the 50s). 

In 1969 he returned to guide the former GS group, which had broken away from Azione Cattolica in the wake of the tumultuous student rebellions that swept Europe following the events of May 1968, in opposition to the so-called "Svolta a sinistra" (Italian for "shift to left", meaning the endorsements of socialists and liberal positions) of the Italian Catholic associationism. Under the new name Communion and Liberation, the movement Giussani founded attracted university students and adults in addition to high school students. Members of the movement, which Giussani led from 1969 until his death in 2005, became influential not only in the Church but also in politics and business.

In 1983 he was given the title of Monsignor by Pope John Paul II. Giussani outlined his views on politics in an address to an assembly of the Italian Christian Democratic party at Assago on 6 February 1987.

Giussani died on 22 February 2005 at the age of eighty-three. Joseph Cardinal Ratzinger, (later Pope Benedict XVI), delivered the homily at his funeral, where he said of Giussani: "[H]e understood that Christianity is not an intellectual system, a packet of dogmas, a moralism; Christianity is rather an encounter, a love story; it is an event". Traces, the magazine of Communion and Liberation, published a retrospective issue on the life and work of Giussani in March 2005. He is interred in Milan's Cimitero Monumentale.

On 17 January 2006, the Holy See officially recognized Giussani as the co-founder, along with Fr. Étienne Pernet, A.A, of the Sisters of Charity of the Assumption, a community of women religious.

Ideas
One of Giussani's central themes is that Christian faith is, in its most primary and central form, the event of a relationship. Giussani stresses that Christianity began as a relationship with a particular individual, Jesus of Nazareth, and that the morals and theology of the Church are an outgrowth of this relationship. One of the central problems for faith in the modern world is that it has been subject to various reductions. Some people experience faith as merely an empty formalism completely focused on following moral rules. There is no longer a living relationship with the person of God, but instead a ritualistic attempt to meet standards. Similarly, faith is sometimes reduced to intellectualism or an attempt to rationally defend certain doctrinal positions. Although morals and doctrine are both important they are not the central event of faith. The central reality of faith is a relationship with Christ as He becomes visible within reality.

Giussani also teaches that the principal goal of a Christian life is to grow in maturity in the relationship with God. According to Giussani, this becomes possible when one sees all of reality as an incarnation of one's own individual relationship with God. Where some forms of Christianity attempt to grow in faith by emphasizing emotional intensity and sentiments (sentimentalism) and others by the rigours of moral perfectionism (moralism), Giussani teaches instead that maturity comes through a growing awareness that all of life's circumstances present an opportunity to better know God.

Works

Giussani's writings have been translated into many different languages.

Books translated into English

PerCorso Trilogy 
The Religious Sense, McGill-Queen's University Press (1 October 1997). .
At the Origin of the Christian Claim, McGill-Queen's University Press (1 January 1998). .
Why the Church?, McGill-Queen's University Press (October, 2000). .

Other works translated into English 
 American Protestant Theology: A Historical Sketch. McGill-Queen's University Press (2013). 
Morality: Memory and Desire Ignatius Press (1 November 1986) 
He Is If He Changes 30Days (1994)
Religious Awareness in Modern Man Communio 25, no. 1 (1998): 104-140. 
The Risk of EducationCrossroad  (15 August 2001) 
The Psalms Crossroad (June 2004)   
The Journey to Truth Is an Experience McGill-Queen's University Press (October 2006) 
Christ, God's Companionship with Man McGill-Queen's University Press (3 July 2015)

Selected online texts
Luigi Giussani Works - Opera Omnia, in progress

Essays, book excerpts
"The Kingdom of Caesar and Action" (1954)
"Experience" (1963)
"Simon, Do You Love Me?" (1998)
"The Five Without" (1998)
"Moved By The Infinite" (2003)
"Faith Is Given Us That We Communicate It" (2004)

Speeches and addresses
"From Utopia to Presence" (1976)
"Religious Sense, Works and Politics" (1986)
"Recognizing Christ" (1994)
"In the Simplicity of my Heart I have gladly given You everything" (1998)
"Woman, Do Not Weep!" (2002)

Interviews
Fr. Giussani - Three Interviews (Retequattro) (Video)
Excerpt from interview with Robi Ronza

Interview with Renato Farina

References

Further reading
Gordon Urquhart. The Pope's Armada: Unlocking the Secrets of Mysteries and Powerful New Sects in the Church, Bantam Press (1 June 1995).                            
Davide Rondoni (Editor), Luigi Giussani (Introduction). Communion and Liberation: A Movement in the Church, McGill-Queen's University Press (April 2000). 
Elisa Buzzi (Editor). A Generative Thought. An Introduction to the Works of Luigi Giussani, McGill-Queen's University Press (December 2003). 
 Alberto Savorana. The Life of Luigi Giussani, McGill-Queen's University Press (2018).

External links
Luigi Giussani Works - Opera Omnia, in progress
The "Right Way" of Fr. Luigi Giussani by Sandro Magister, L'Espresso
Editorial by Gregory Wolfe, Image: A Journal of the Arts and Religion
Communion and Liberation official site

1922 births
2005 deaths
People from Desio
20th-century Italian educators
20th-century Italian writers
20th-century Italian male writers
20th-century Italian Roman Catholic theologians

21st-century Italian writers
21st-century Italian male writers
Berchet Lyceum
Burials at the Cimitero Monumentale di Milano
Communion and Liberation
Founders of Catholic religious communities
Italian educational theorists
21st-century Italian Roman Catholic theologians
Italian Servants of God
21st-century venerated Christians
Academic staff of the Università Cattolica del Sacro Cuore
20th-century Italian Roman Catholic priests